Slavko Dimеvski was a Macedonian priest, historian and screenwriter. From January 1, 1975, to June 30, 1983, he worked for Institute for Sociological, Political and Juridical Research as Staff with a scientific and supporting staff position. Slavko Dimevski has been accused by Bulgarian historians to have created some deceptions and historical misinterpretations, related to common Bulgarian-Macedonian historical issues.

Books
Struggle for independence of the local orthodox churches 
History of the Macedonian Orthodox Church 
Nikola Karev 
The development of the Macedonian national idea to the creation of TMRO

Screenplays
Smilevskiot kongres (1973) 
Suti i rogati (1975) 
Vapcarov (1977) 
Kurirot na Goce Delcev (1979) 
Junacko koleno (1984)

See also
 List of people from Kumanovo

References

1920 births
1994 deaths
Macedonian writers
People from Kumanovo